Dino Giarrusso (born 11 September 1974 in Catania) is an Italian television personality and politician.

Biography
Giarrusso graduated in 1997 in Communication Sciences at the University of Siena; he worked as a journalist, collaborating with La Repubblica and L'Unità, as well as a television author for local Sicilian newspapers. He also shot various commercials and documentaries, always relating to his homeland, and was assistant director of Ettore Scola, Marco Risi and Ricky Tognazzi. Giarrusso also played some minor roles in Italian TV series.

From 2014 to 2018, he worked as a correspondent for the TV program Le Iene, broadcast on Italia 1.

In 2019, he was elected as an MEP in the European Parliament election, resulting,  with 117,211 preference votes, the most voted candidate of the Five Star Movement.

References

1974 births
Living people
MEPs for Italy 2019–2024
Five Star Movement MEPs
Five Star Movement politicians
Politicians from Catania